Hasan Ahmad al-Lawzi (1952 – 13 July 2020) was a Yemeni politician and writer. He was the Minister of Information.

Biography
Al-Lawzi was born in Sana'a and was educated at Cairo's Al-Azhar University. He published several volumes of poetry and short stories that reflected his profound interest in the Yemeni revolution. His work has been translated into English and was included in anthologies of modern Arabian literature during the 1980s. He later became involved in government and held a number of important positions.

Al-Lawzi died on 13 July 2020, at the age of 68, after contracting COVID-19 during the COVID-19 pandemic in Egypt.

See also
 Cabinet of Yemen

References

Yemeni writers
21st-century Yemeni politicians
1952 births
People from Sanaa
2020 deaths
Al-Azhar University alumni
Deaths from the COVID-19 pandemic in Egypt
Information ministers of Yemen
20th-century Yemeni poets
21st-century Yemeni poets
20th-century Yemeni politicians
Ambassadors of Yemen to Jordan
Members of the Consultative Assembly of Yemen
20th-century Arabic poets
21st-century Arabic poets
Yemeni lyricists